The César Award for the Best Producer (French: César du meilleur producteur) was awarded only twice, in 1996 and in 1997.

Winners and nominees

References

Retired César Awards
Film producers by award